The Subcommittee on Railroads, Pipelines, and Hazardous Materials is a subcommittee within the House Transportation and Infrastructure Committee.

Jurisdiction
The Subcommittee oversees regulation of railroads by the Surface Transportation Board, including economic regulations; Amtrak, rail safety, the Federal Railroad Administration, and the National Mediation Board, which handles railway labor disputes. It is also oversees of the Pipeline and Hazardous Materials Safety Administration within the U.S. Department of Transportation, which is responsible for the safety of the nation's oil and gas pipelines as well as the transportation of hazardous materials.

Members, 117th Congress

Historical membership rosters

115th Congress

116th Congress

External links
 Subcommittee website

References

Transportation Railroads
United States railroad regulation
Amtrak
Hazardous materials
Transport safety organizations
Pipelines in the United States